United Coffee is one of Europe’s largest coffee roasters. It produces and distributes a wide range of coffee, coffee machines and related services through retail and out-of-home distribution channels, including hotels, restaurants and cafés. The company is based in Geneva, Switzerland.

Company

United Coffee was founded in 1818 and now employs nearly 1,000 people and roasts over 60,000 tons of coffee per year. The company buys 1% of the world’s total coffee exports per year. The company is a market leader within the private label and single portion coffee sector and owns retail and out-of-home brands such as Grand Café, Templo, Rosca, and Smit & Dorlas. It also supplies some of Europe’s leading food service companies, including Subway, McDonald’s and thousands of local cafes and restaurants.

United Coffee is dedicated to working with internationally recognised codes of conduct, including Fairtrade, Rainforest Alliance and UTZ Certified and is a European leader in sustainable coffee.
 
Backed by mid-market private equity fund, CapVest, United Coffee is a leading roaster across six European countries: France, Germany, Netherlands, Spain, Switzerland and the United Kingdom.

History

The history of United Coffee dates back to 1818 when a small shop roaster, Mr. Sweens and his family, founded the company, then named Drie Mollen, in 's-Hertogenbosch (den Bosch) in the south of the Netherlands. By the late 1900s, Drie Mollen had begun its development into an international coffee roasting business.
 
By the 1990s, five leading tea and coffee companies had joined the original founding Sweens family and the business continued to grow and develop.

In 2008, CapVest, the private equity fund, bought Drie Mollen. In March 2010, the company was rebranded United Coffee and its head office was moved from the Netherlands to Geneva.

References

External links
 United Coffee’s official website

Coffee companies
Manufacturing companies based in Geneva
Food and drink companies established in 1818
Food and drink companies of Switzerland
Coffee in Switzerland
Agriculture companies of Switzerland
1810s establishments in Switzerland